Jonathan Chaves (born June 8, 1943), B.A. Brooklyn College, 1965; M.A. Columbia University, 1966; PhD Columbia University, 1971, is Professor of Chinese Language and Literature at The George Washington University in Washington, D.C.  He is a translator of classic Chinese poetry.

Translations

He published the first books in English or any Western language on such masters as Mei Yaochen 梅堯臣 (1002–60); Yang Wanli 楊萬里 (1127-1206); Yuan Hongdao 袁宏道 (1568-1610); the painter Wu Li 吳歷(1632-1718; as a poet); and Zhang Ji 張籍 (c.766-c.830).    Eliot Weinberger, in his book 19 Ways of Looking at Wang Wei, cites Chaves among the 4 best scholar-translators of Chinese poetry in English, placing him with translators Burton Watson, A.C. Graham and Arthur Waley.

Awards

He is the 2014 recipient of the American Literary Translators Association’s Lucien Stryk Prize for his book Every Rock a Universe: The Yellow Mountains and Chinese Travel Writing. His book Pilgrim of the Clouds: Poems and Essays from Ming China by Yuan Hung-tao and His Brothers was a finalist for the National Book Award in the translation category. He and co-author J. Thomas Rimer won the 1998 Japan-U.S. Friendship Commission Prize for the Translation of Japanese Literature for their Japanese and Chinese Poems to Sing:  The Wakan Rōei Shū ( http://www.keenecenter.org/translation_prize.html )

Research

Chaves’ research has emphasized the relationship between poetry and painting in China, encompassing comparisons with Japanese and Western poetry and painting.  He was invited to curate an exhibition on the interrelationships between painting, poetry and calligraphy at The China Institute in America (New York), which took place in 2000, and produced a catalog from that exhibit called The Chinese Painter as Poet.

Chaves also has published on Chinese-language poetry Kanshi in Japan. In 1997, he and J. Thomas Rimer published the first translation and study in any Western language of the bilingual (Japanese and Chinese) anthology of the early 11th century, "Japanese and Chinese Poems to Sing: The Wakan Rōei Shū" (Columbia University Press). This won the 1998 Japan-U.S. Friendship Commission Prize for the Translation of Japanese Literature  ( http://www.keenecenter.org/translation_prize.html ).

He has also published original poetry, both in modernist style and in neo-formalist metrical forms with rhyme, in such literary magazines as IRONWOOD, 19 (1982, pp. 134–135), THE GREENFIELD REVIEW (Vol. 11, 1 & 2 double issue, 1983, pp. 145–146), and CHRONICLES:  A Magazine of American Culture (May, 2009, pp. 12, 26-27; September, 2015, p. 17; October, 2016, pp. 15 and 41; November, 2017, p. 24; June, 2019 , pp.   20 and 41; July, 2020, pp. 22 and 42 ), ACADEMIC QUESTIONS, July, 2020 (three poems).

Selected Translations

 "Every Rock a Universe: The Yellow Mountains and Chinese Travel Writing", Floating World Editions, 2013
 "West Cliff Poems: The Poetry of Weng Chüan", Ahadada Books, 2010
 "Cloud Gate Song: The Verse of Tang Poet Zhang Ji", Floating World Editions, 2006
 "Heaven My Blanket, Earth My Pillow: Poems from Sung Dynasty China by Yang Wan-li", Weatherhill, Tokyo, 1975. New edition, 2004

Selected bibliography
 Chaves, J. (1975). Heaven My Blanket, Earth My Pillow:  Poems from Sung-Dynasty China by Yang Wan-li. Tokyo:  Weatherhill. 
 Chaves, J. (1976). Mei Yao-chʻen and the Development of Early Sung Poetry. New York: Columbia University Press. 
 Chaves, J. (1978). Pilgrim of the Clouds:  Poems and Essays from Ming-Dynasty China by Yüan Hung-tao and His Brothers. Tokyo:  Weatherhill. 
 Chaves, J. (1986). The Columbia Book of Later Chinese Poetry: Yuan, Ming, and Qing Dynasties (1279-1911). New York: Columbia University Press. 
 Chaves, J., J. Thomas Rimer, Stephen Addiss, and Hiroyuki Suzuki. (1991). Shisendō:  Hall of the Poetry Immortals. New York and Tokyo:  Weatherhill. 
 Chaves, J. (1993). Singing of the Source: Nature and God in the Poetry of the Chinese painter Wu Li. Honolulu: University of Hawaii Press. 
 Chaves, J. and J. Thomas Rimer. (1997). Japanese and Chinese Poems to Sing:  The Wakan Rōei Shū. New York, Columbia University Press. 
 Chaves, J. and Stephen Addiss. (2000).  Old Taoist:  The Life, Art and Poetry of Kodojin. New York, Columbia University Press. 
 Chaves, J. (2000). The Chinese Painter as Poet. New York: China Institute Gallery, China Institute. 
 Chaves, J. (2006). Cloud Gate Song:  The Verse of Tang Poet Zhang Ji. Warren, CT:  Floating World Editions. 
 Chaves, J. (2011). West Cliff Poems:  The Poetry of Weng Chüan. Tokyo:  Ahadada Books.  
 Chaves, J. (2013). Every Rock a Universe:  The Yellow Mountains and Chinese Travel Writing. Warren, CT:  Floating World Editions. 
 Chaves, J. (2017). Cave of the Immortals:  The Poetry and Prose of Bamboo Painter Wen Tong (1019-1079). Warren, CT:  Floating World Editions.

References

External links
 Biographical Sketch

  Festschrift for Chaves published Fall 2017

Living people
Columbian College of Arts and Sciences faculty
1943 births
Columbia Graduate School of Arts and Sciences alumni
Brooklyn College alumni
American sinologists